Tango! may refer to:

 ¡Tango!, a 1933 Argentine musical romance film
 Tango Desktop Project, an open-source initiative

See also
 Tango, a partner dance 
 Tango (disambiguation)